Mateo Joseph Fernández-Regatillo (born 19 October 2003) is a Spanish-English professional footballer who plays as a forward for Leeds United.

Club career
Joseph is a youth product of Racing Santander, moving to the academy of Espanyol in 2017 after a prolific season. On 4 January 2022, he transferred to the English side Leeds United on a three year contract, where he was originally assigned to their U-23 side. He made his senior and professional debut with Leeds United as a starter in a 1–0 EFL Cup loss to Wolverhampton Wanderers on 9 November 2022. His Premier League debut was three days later, coming off the bench in the 89th minute to take the place of Rasmus Kristensen against Tottenham Hotspur.

International career
In March 2023, Joseph received his first call-up to the England U20 squad.

Personal life
Joseph was born in Spain to an English father of Antiguan descent and a Spanish mother. He holds Spanish and British citizenship. He is a relative of Emile Heskey with his father being the former England striker's cousin.

Playing style
Joseph is a strong and technically proficient forward, and has earned playing comparisons to a young Sergio Agüero. He is a prolific scorer, having scored 14 goals in 21 games as a U19 for Espanyol in the 2021-22 season.

Career statistics

Notes

References

External links
 
 
 

2003 births
Living people
Footballers from Santander, Spain
Spanish footballers
Spanish people of Antigua and Barbuda descent
Sportspeople of Antigua and Barbuda descent
Spanish people of English descent
Association football forwards
Leeds United F.C. players
Premier League players